Rotana Hotel Management Corporation PJSC is a hotel management company in the Middle East, Africa, the Balkans and Turkey. It has a portfolio of over 100 properties in 26 cities and operates six sub brands which include Rotana Hotels & Resorts, Centro Hotels by Rotana, Rayhaan Hotels & Resorts by Rotana, Arjaan Hotel Apartments by Rotana, Edge by Rotana and The Residences by Rotana.

Its headquarters is located in Abu Dhabi, United Arab Emirates. where it was founded in 1992 by Nasser Al Nowais and the Lebanese Selim El Zyr. Rotana manages under its Rayhaan Hotels & Resorts by Rotana brand the Rose Rayhaan by Rotana Hotel in Dubai. It was for 5 consecutive years (2009 - 2013) with 333 m (1,093 ft) the world's tallest hotel.

History

The Rotana Hotel Management Corporation was founded in 1992 and is operating across the Middle East and Africa. The company was founded by partners Nasser Al Nowais and Selim El Zyr, who were both already well established within the Middle East hospitality industry, with Nasser Al Nowais having previously been instrumental in the formation of the Abu Dhabi National Hotels.

 1993 Rotana opens its first hotel, Beach Rotana Abu Dhabi, in Abu Dhabi, United Arab Emirates.
 1995 Nael Hashweh joins Rotana whilst Imad W. Elias bringing factors critical to the future success of the company.
 1996 Opening of Rimal Rotana in Dubai, United Arab Emirates
 1997 Four years after the opening of the first hotel in Abu Dhabi, Jumeirah Rotana and Al Bustan Rotana opened in Dubai and Al Rawda Arjaan by Rotana in Abu Dhabi.
 1999 was the opening of Sharjah Rotana in Sharjah, UAE and Al Ain Rotana in Al Ain, UAE.
 2000 following the opening of Gefinor Rotana in Beirut, Lebanon. Rotana branched out of UAE opening properties in Lebanon and Egypt and had a total of 13 operating properties following the companies aim to open a Rotana property in each major city in the Middle East region. Additional openings in Dubai, UAE, during 2000 were Rihab Rotana and Towers Rotana.
 2002 was the opening of Al Maha Arjaan by Rotana in Abu Dhabi, UAE.
 2005 Rotana already with 20 properties in operation, opened its first property in Syria, Queen Center Rotana Suites and continues to receive awards, such as the "Best Hotel Brand Award", for being the highest rated hotel brand within the GCC.
 2006 was the opening of Al Manshar Rotana - Kuwait City, Kuwait and the opening of Fujairah Rotana Resort & Spa - Al Aqah Beach in Fujairah and of BurJuman Arjaan by Rotana in Dubai.
 2008 Rotana engages in a brand revitalization project resulting in the unveiling of its new product brands; Arjaan by Rotana and Rayhaan Hotels and Resorts by Rotana. Opening of Arjaan by Rotana Dubai Media City and Media Rotana in Dubai, UAE.
 2009 Rotana launched its new budget hotel concept: Centro with the opening of Centro Yas Island in Abu Dhabi. Rose Rayhaan by Rotana, a soaring 72 floor tower structure, 333 metres high opened as the world's tallest hotel.
 2010 Opening of the second Centro Hotel by Rotana: Centro Barsha in Dubai.
 2012 Opening of Centro Capital Centre - Abu Dhabi, UAE, (Opened 3rd Quarter), Al Ghurair Rayhaan by Rotana - Dubai, UAE and Al Ghurair Arjaan by Rotana - Dubai, UAE, (Opened 4th Quarter)
 2013 Majestic Arjaan by Rotana opens in Muharraq, Manama as Rotana's first hotel in Bahrain, and Karbala Rayhaan by Rotana opens in Karbala, Iraq
 2014 Hili Rayhaan opens as the second property in Al Ain, UAE, Salalah Rotana Resort opens in Salalah as Rotana's first hotel in Oman. The Boulevard Arjaan by Rotana, the first Rotana hotel in Amman and Jordan. 
 2015 Opening of Burgu Arjaan by Rotana & Tango Arjaan by Rotana, Istanbul, Turkey and Capital Centre Arjaan by Rotana in Abu Dhabi, UAE
 2016 City Centre Rotana Doha opens in Qatar, Downtown Rotana in Bahrain, Rosh Rayhaan by Rotana in Riyadh, Saudi Arabia, Centro Capital Doha opened in Qatar, Amman Rotana, Jordan, Rotana Hotel Amman, Centro Shaheen opens in Jeddah, Saudi Arabia and Kin Plaza Arjaan by Rotana, Kinshasa, Democratic Republic of the Congo
 2017 Erbil Arjaan by Rotana opens in Erbil, Kurdistan, Iraq, Centro Waha, Riyadh, Saudi Arabia
 2018 Pearl Rotana, Abu Dhabi, UAE, Saadiyat Rotana Resort & Villas, Abu Dhabi, UAE, Al Bandar Rotana and Al Bandar Arjaan by Rotana, Dubai, UAE, Centro WestSide Istanbul and WestSide Arjaan by Rotana, Istanbul, Turkey. Centro Salama in Jeddah, Saudi Arabia and Centro Olaya in Riyadh, Saudi Arabia opened.
 2019 Rotana signed a hotel management agreement for Babylon Rotana in Baghdad, Iraq. Rotana enters Bosnia and Herzegovina with the opening of Bosmal Arjaan by Rotana in Sarajevo and Tanzania with the opening of Johari Rotana in Dar es Salaam.
 2020 Rotana enters Morocco with the newly acquired Palmeraie Rotana Resort in Marrakech, opened Sedra Arjaan by Rotana on The Pearl-Qatar, Centro Corniche, Al Khobar in Saudi Arabia and Al Jaddaf Rotana in Dubai, UAE.
 2022 Rotana opens Centro Mada Amman in Jordan, Rotana's third hotel in Amman, Slemani Rotana opens in Sulaymaniyah, Kurdistan, Iraq and Dana Rayhaan by Rotana in Dammam, Saudi Arabia. Rotana announces the launch of its newest brand: Edge by Rotana  at the Arabian Travel Market (ATM) 2022. and opens 2 properties under the new brand: Arabian Park Dubai, an Edge by Rotana Hotel and Park Apartments Dubai, an Edge by Rotana Hotel in Dubai, UAE.
 2023 Rotana opened its 3rd Edge by Rotana property in Dubai, UAE: DAMAC Hills 2 Hotel, an Edge by Rotana Hotel

Future openings

New Rotana properties of all four sub brands are to open:

 2023 - Al Reem Rayhaan by Rotana, Jubail, KSA
 2023 - Riviera Rayhaan by Rotana, Doha, Qatar
 2023 - Al Manakha Rotana, Medinah, KSA
 2023 - Ruba Rayhaan by Rotana, Makkah, KSA
 2023 - Al Khobar Rayhaan by Rotana, Al Khobar, KSA
 2023 - Azure Rotana Resort & Spa, Oran, Algeria
 2023 - Al Mouj Rayhaan by Rotana, Muscat, Oman
 2023 - Bloom Arjaan by Rotana, Abu Dhabi, UAE
 2023 - Bomonti Arjaan by Rotana, Istanbul, Türkiye
 2024 - Luxor Rotana Resort, Luxor, Egypt

Gallery

References

External links
Rotana's website

 
Hotel chains in the United Arab Emirates
Companies based in Abu Dhabi
Emirati brands